Aphelolepis is an extinct genus of prehistoric bony fish that lived during the Carnian stage of the Late Triassic epoch.

See also

 Prehistoric fish
 List of prehistoric bony fish

References

Late Triassic fish